The 1981–82 Liga Alef season saw Hapoel Hadera (champions of the North Division) and Hapoel Ashkelon (champions of the South Division) win the title and promotion to Liga Artzit. Maccabi Shefa-'Amr also promoted after promotion play-offs.

North Division

South Division

Maccabi Lazarus Holon suspended from the league and demoted to Liga Bet, due to riot in their eighteenth match against Hapoel Holon, which abandoned in the 44th minute.

Promotion play-offs

Maccabi Shefa-'Amr promoted to Liga Artzit.

References
Liga Alef tables Davar, 9.5.82, Historical Jewish Press 
South division Davar, 7.3.82, Historical Jewish Press 
Hapoel Bat Yam - Shefa-'Amr 0:0 Davar, 6.6.82, Historical Jewish Press 
Zahi Armeli Maccabi Haifa 

Liga Alef seasons
Israel
3